David MacKenzie or Mackenzie may refer to:
 David Neil MacKenzie (1926–2001), British linguist and Iranist
 Dave MacKenzie (politician) (born 1946), Canadian politician
 David Mackenzie (director) (born 1966), Scottish director
 David MacKenzie (rugby union) (1921–2005), Scottish international rugby union player
 David Mackenzie (trade unionist) (1922–1989), Scottish trade union leader
 David Mackenzie (medievalist) (1943-2016), English medievalist
 D. J. M. Mackenzie (1905–1994), British colonial medical official
 David D. Mackenzie (1860–1926), first Dean of Detroit Junior College
 David MacKenzie (researcher) (born 1949), Australian social researcher
 Dave MacKenzie (soccer) (born 1956), retired Scottish-Canadian soccer defender

See also
 David McKenzie (disambiguation)